Ebrahimabad (also Romanized as Ebrāhīmābād and Ībrāhīmābād) is a village in Ebrahimabad Rural District, Ramand District, Buin Zahra County, Qazvin Province, Iran. At the 2016 census, its population was 938, in 300 families. 

The primary language of the people is Tati language. in Tati language, this village called "Bermoe" or "Bermowa" (Persian: برموه). 

Dr Fariborz Raisdana who was an Iranian economist, socialist, activist, professor, and a member of the Iranian Writers Association was born and buried in Ebrahim Abad.

Manouchehr Ganji, a human rights activist and a former Minister of Education of Iran was born in Ebrahim Abad.

References 

Populated places in Buin Zahra County